The 1997 Individual Long Track/Grasstrack World Championship was the 27th edition of the FIM speedway Individual Long Track World Championship. For the first time the Championship was decided on a Grand Prix system (a series of races) and also contained races on grasstrack. 

The new system combined with the relatively new Speedway World Championship Grand Prix which started in 1995, effectively resulted in a separation of speedway riders. The leading speedway riders (with the exception of several Long Track specialists) could not commit to the Longtrack/Grasstrack schedule and therefore competed in the Speedway World Championship. The days of a speedway world champion in both normal track and Long Track speedway were gone.

The world title was won by Tommy Dunker of Germany.

Venues

Final Classification

References 

1997
Speedway competitions in the Czech Republic
Speedway competitions in France
Speedway competitions in Germany
Speedway competitions in the Netherlands
Long